Radio Çukurova is a regional radio network of the Turkish Radio and Television Corporation (TRT).

Geography

The broadcast area includes the provinces of Mersin, Adana, Hatay, Osmaniye and parts of Kahramanmaraş, Kayseri, Niğde, Karaman and Konya. Since most of provinces are in Çukurova region (Cilicia of the antiquity) the network is named Çukurova. The radio studio is in Mersin and the main medium wave (MW) transmitter is in Kazanlı a suburb of Mersin. But there are also various FM transmitters frequencies of which are shown below.

History
In 1962, a low power (2 kW) radio station was established for the city Adana. The transmitter which was housed next to radio studio was a Turkish-made transmitter. But then TRT decided to increase the broadcast area and the power. Thus a 300 kW transmitter was purchased from NEC a Japan -based company and a new transmitter station was established in Kazanlı. The studio was swiftly moved to Mersin and the regional network began transmission on 3 March 1968. The broadcast continued for 40 years. But in 2009, a new transmitter was purchased from Nautel, a Canada -based company.

Studio and the production
In the early years Radyo Çukurova was a part of Radyo 1 network with some local production. Presently  however, TRT Çukurova broadcasts regional programs during the morning hours up to 01 PM. It also collaborates with Radyo Türkü during the evening hours. The local production is carried in the TRT building in Mersin. TRT reporters and the service people to unattended transmitter stations also serve in the building.

Frequencies
Frequency of the Middle-wave transmitter in Kazanlı is 630 kHz. The frequencies of the FM transmitters (1-5 kW TX output) are as follows.

References

Adana
Turkish radio networks
Turkish Radio and Television Corporation